Dhundle Raste is a Pakistani telefilm featuring Vital Signs, a popular Pakistani pop music group. It was written by Haseena Moin and directed by Shoaib Mansoor, the famous duo who had previously written and directed the epic Ankahi. The television film features several famous songs of Vital Signs. Due to its novel storyline, it became one of the most popular television films of its time.

Cast
 Junaid Jamshed
 Salman Ahmed
 Rohail Hyatt
 Shahzad Hasan (Shahi)
 S. A. Rehman
 Nayyar Kamal
 Tabinda Sheikh

See also
 Vital Signs
 Shoaib Mansoor
 Haseena Moin
 Junaid Jamshed
 Salman Ahmed
 Rohail Hyatt
 Shahzad Hasan (Shahi)

References

Pakistani drama television series
Urdu-language television shows
Pakistan Television Corporation original programming
Pakistani television films
Television shows set in Karachi